Rotorfest is an all-helicopter airshow held by the American Helicopter Museum. Rotorfest is billed by the museum as the World's Largest All-Helicopter Airshow. The Airshow takes place at the Brandywine Airport in West Chester, Pennsylvania. Aircraft static displays were located on the north side of the airport around the American Helicopter Museum. The first Rotorfest was in 1996.

Rotorfest 2009

Rotorfest 2009, held in October, had 7,000 visitors in attendance, the two-day event showcased the value and excitement of rotary wing flight. Military and civilian aircraft were featured in flight demonstrations and ground displays while rides were offered throughout the day.

Rotorfest 2010

RotorFest 2010 is scheduled for 10:00am to 4:30pm. September 25 and 26, 2010

Rotorfest 2011

RotorFest 2011 is scheduled for September 24 and 25, 2011

See also
 Fly-in
 Flypast
 List of airshows
 List of airshow accidents

References

External links
 Rotorfest 
 Rotorfest page at David Schultz Airshows
 Rotorfest at Helicopter Association International

Air shows in the United States
Helicopters
Events in Pennsylvania
West Goshen Township, Chester County, Pennsylvania
Aviation in Pennsylvania
Recurring events established in 1996
1996 establishments in Pennsylvania